Sergio Prezioso (born 1978) is an Italian pianist, educator and media composer. He is most widely known for having been Music Director of the BBC Frozen Planet Live Show. He lives in London where he works as a composer, pianist, teacher and lecturer.

Biography

Musical education 
Born in Italy, Prezioso was introduced to music with piano studies at age 5. In the early years he began to perform in public as a soloist, participating in and winning numerous national and international competitions, such as the International Piano Competition "Monopoli". At the age of 18 he was accepted as a student by Lucia Passaglia, pupil of Alfred Cortot and Arturo Benedetti Michelangeli.

He studied at the Conservatory of Music “Gaetano Braga”, graduating with highest marks and honours in 2000. In the same year he was awarded the "Best National Young Pianist" prize, with the subsequent publication of a CD including the Bach-Busoni Chaconne. Subsequently, he began a concert activity that led him to perform, in recital and with orchestra, in many venues in Italy and abroad.

In 2006, he graduated in Jazz at the Conservatory of Music “Alfredo Casella” of L’Aquila, Italy, and after winning a scholarship to attend Berklee College of Music in Boston, he moved to the United States and graduated Summa Cum Laude at Berklee in 2012, majoring in Contemporary Writing and Production with a minor in Music for TV & New Media. In 2010 he was among the top students at Berklee and won the John Dankworth Award (Boston, USA) for Best Vocal Arrangement of the year.

In 2015 he moved to the United Kingdom to study at the University of Salford as a scholarship recipient, where he graduated with Distinction with a Master of Science in Audio Production degree.

Career 
In 2012 he moved to New York City, where he soon started to work as a media composer for music production houses Elias Arts and Finger Music, writing music for TV advertising campaigns.

As a pianist, he collaborated with artists such as Roberto Carlos, Fabio Concato, Bruno De Filippi, Thomas Sheret, Kenwood Dennard, Mike Mangini.

He has been assistant professor of Prince Charles Alexander for the Vocal Technology Course at Berklee College of Music online.

He wrote the music for a variety of multimedia projects as well as the scores for major TV commercials, including Google, Johnson & Johnson, Mitsubishi, Geico, Comcast, and Mercedes among others. As a music preparator, he collaborated with composer Michael A. Levine for the realisation of the Star Wars: Detours music soundtrack.

He was part of Hollywood Elite composers team.

As a sound engineer, he has mixed and mastered numerous projects, including the award winning documentaries Naleena, and HeartWood.

In addition to his work as a composer, Sergio Prezioso has been Music Director for several major acts, including TV shows Dancing with the Stars and BBC Frozen Planet, in collaboration with Lincoln Center Stage.

References 

Audio engineers
20th-century Italian musicians
21st-century English musicians
21st-century Italian musicians
English pianists
Italian pianists
Living people
1978 births
Music directors
20th-century English musicians